The Sphinx class was the first type of steamer corvettes in service in the French Navy. They were motorised by French-made steam engines cloned from a low-pressure Newcomen steam engine purchased from Fawcett, in Liverpool, and made at Indret. Initially classified as "paddle corvettes", they were later reclassified as "first-class avisos".

Ships in class 
 Sphinx
Builder: Rochefort
Ordered:
Laid down: 
Launched: 
Completed: 
Fate: Wrecked

 Ténaré
Builder: 
Ordered:
Laid down: 
Launched: 
Completed: 
Fate:

 Euphrate
Builder: 
Ordered:
Laid down: 
Launched: 
Completed: 
Fate:

Sources and references